Jayden Greig (born October 19, 2003) is a Canadian actor best known for his lead role in Sean McNamara's film adaptation of Bruce Coville's novel, Aliens Ate My Homework on Netflix, and its sequel, Aliens Stole My Body. Jayden has also appeared in The Shape of Water (2017), Murdoch Mysteries (2013), Super Why (2015) and Playdate (2015–2016). He was nominated at the Young Entertainer Awards for Best Leading Young Actor in a Feature Film for his work in Aliens Ate My Homework and won Best Ensemble Performance in Film at the Young Artist Awards, amongst many other awards and nominations.

Filmography

Film

Television

Awards and nominations

References 

Canadian male film actors
2003 births
Living people
Canadian male television actors
Canadian male child actors